The second Blair ministry lasted from June 2001 to May 2005. Following the financial crisis in Japan at the end of the 1990s, there was a brief recession in other parts of the developed world including Germany, Italy and France in the early-2000s, but the UK avoided recession and continued to maintain a strong economy and low unemployment.

By the time the next general election was on the horizon, Labour were looking well positioned for a record third successive term in government. Unemployment remained low and the economy remained strong with more than a decade of unbroken growth, and education and healthcare had changed for the better as a result of expenditure by Labour.

However, the Labour government had attracted controversy by sending British troops to fight in Afghanistan in the aftermath of the 11 September terrorist attacks on the United States in 2001, and even more so when it joined the American-led invasion of Iraq eighteen months later – particularly when it emerged that the ousted Iraqi leader Saddam Hussein's alleged weapons of mass destruction were never found, and serious questions were raised about the issue of going to war. Although the regimes in both of these countries were swiftly ended by British and American troops, the remaining British forces were not withdrawn from Iraq until 2009 and not from Afghanistan until 2021.

Soon after the controversial invasion of Iraq in 2003, Labour support in the opinion polls fell and the Conservatives drew level with them in at least one poll during 2003. However, this did little to end speculation about the future of their unpopular leader Iain Duncan Smith and in October 2003, he lost a vote of no confidence and was replaced by Michael Howard, who stood unopposed for the leadership role and took control without a leadership contest.

Cabinet

Changes
May 2002 – Stephen Byers resigns and the Department of Transport, Local Government & the Regions is broken up. Alistair Darling becomes Secretary of State for Transport. John Prescott's Office of the Deputy Prime Minister assumes the Local Government & the Regions portfolio. Andrew Smith becomes Work and Pensions Secretary. Paul Boateng becomes Chief Secretary to the Treasury. Complete list of changes
October 2002 – Estelle Morris resigns. Charles Clarke becomes Education Secretary; John Reid becomes Minister without Portfolio and Labour Party chairman. Paul Murphy becomes Northern Ireland Secretary. Peter Hain becomes Welsh Secretary.
March 2003 – Robin Cook resigns. John Reid becomes Lord President of the Council & Leader of the House of Commons. Ian McCartney becomes Minister without Portfolio and Labour Party chairman.
May 2003 – Clare Short resigns and is succeeded by The Baroness Amos as International Development Secretary.
June 2003 – In a reshuffle John Reid becomes Health Secretary. The Lord Falconer of Thoroton assumes the new position of Secretary of State for Constitutional Affairs, also becoming Lord Chancellor. Alistair Darling becomes Scottish Secretary remaining also Transport Secretary. Peter Hain becomes Lord Privy Seal & Leader of the House of Commons, remaining also Welsh Secretary. Alan Milburn, The Lord Irvine and Helen Liddell leave the Cabinet. Complete list of changes
October 2003 – The Baroness Amos becomes Lord President of the Council & Leader of the House of Lords, following the death of The Lord Williams of Mostyn. Hilary Benn becomes International Development Secretary.
September 2004 – Andrew Smith resigns as Secretary of State for Work and Pensions and is succeeded by Alan Johnson. Alan Milburn returns to government with a seat in the Cabinet as Chancellor of the Duchy of Lancaster mainly at the head of policy co-ordination; he replaces Douglas Alexander, who was not in the Cabinet.
December 2004 – David Blunkett resigns as Home Secretary and is succeeded by Charles Clarke. Ruth Kelly succeeds Clarke as Secretary of State for Education and Skills.

List of ministers

Prime Minister, the Cabinet Office and non-Departmental ministers

Departments of state

Law officers

Parliament

Whips

References

General

External links

British ministries
Government
2000s in the United Kingdom
2001 establishments in the United Kingdom
2005 disestablishments in the United Kingdom
Second ministry
Ministries of Elizabeth II
New Labour
Cabinets established in 2001
Cabinets disestablished in 2005